In the Nick of Time was the second album by Nicolette Larson. It features a duet with Michael McDonald, keyboards from Bill Payne, backing vocals from Bobby LaKind and Rosemary Butler, Ronnie Montrose on guitar and other collaborators. Larson had a minor hit with her McDonald duet, "Let Me Go, Love".

Track listing
"Dancin' Jones" (Jerry Leiber, Mike Stoller, John Sembello, Ralph Dino) - 3:18
"Just in the Nick of Time" (Nicolette Larson, Ted Templeman, Lauren Wood) - 3:24
"Let Me Go, Love" (Michael McDonald, B.J. Cook Foster) - 3:49
"Rio de Janeiro Blue" (Richard Torrance, John Haeny) - 3:50
"Breaking Too Many Hearts" (Lauren Wood) - 3:33
"Back in My Arms" (Brian Holland, Eddie Holland, Lamont Dozier) - 3:51
"Fallen" (Lauren Wood) - 3:23
"Daddy" (Bobby Troup) - 3:23
"Isn't It Always Love" (Karla Bonoff) - 3:06
"Trouble" (Lowell George) - 2:31

Charts

Personnel
Nicolette Larson - lead and backing vocals
Paul Barrere – guitar (tracks 1-9)
Bob Glaub – bass guitar (tracks 1-9)
Rick Shlosser – drums (tracks 1-9)
Bill Payne - keyboards (tracks 2-5, 9)
Ted Templeman - percussion (tracks 1-9), keyboards (track 6), backing vocals (tracks 1, 2, 4, 7, 8)
Bobby LaKind - congas (tracks 1-9), backing vocals (track 6)

Additional musicians
The Memphis Horns - horns (tracks 1, 4)
Ronnie Montrose – guitar solo (track 2)
Michael McDonald - lead vocals (track 3)
Jerry Haye, Ben Coli - flugelhorns (track 4)
Jim Horn - saxophone solo (tracks 5, 6)
Lee Thornburg - trumpet solo (track 8)
Van Dyke Parks - keyboards (track 10)
Tom Johnston - backing vocals (track 1)
Rosemary Butler – backing vocals (tracks 5, 6)
Jimmie Haskell - string arrangements (tracks 3-7, 9), horn arrangements (tracks 3, 6, 9)
Jerry Jumonville - horn arrangements (tracks 5, 8)

Production
Ted Templeman - producer
Donn Landee, Ken Deane - engineer
Peter Whorf - art direction, design
Joel Bernstein - photography

References

Nicolette Larson; In the Nick of Time liner notes; Warner Bros. Records 1979
All Music Guide []

1979 albums
Nicolette Larson albums
Albums produced by Ted Templeman
albums arranged by Jimmie Haskell
Warner Records albums